Jassem Al-Jaber (Arabic:جاسم الجابر) (born 15 April 1989) is a Qatari footballer. He currently plays as a left back for Al-Waab.

Career
He formerly played for Al-Arabi, Mesaimeer, Al-Shahania, and Lusail .

External links

References

Living people
1989 births
Qatari footballers
Al-Arabi SC (Qatar) players
Mesaimeer SC players
Al-Shahania SC players
Lusail SC players
Al-Waab SC players
Qatar Stars League players
Qatari Second Division players
Association football fullbacks
Place of birth missing (living people)